Silas Hogan (September 15, 1911 – January 9, 1994) was an American blues musician who played swamp blues and Louisiana blues. His most notable recordings are "Airport Blues" and "Lonesome La La". He was the front man of the Rhythm Ramblers. Hogan was inducted into the Louisiana Blues Hall of Fame.

Biography
Hogan learned to play the guitar as a teenager and was performing regularly by the late 1930s. He was influenced by Jimmy Reed, as were Lazy Lester and Slim Harpo. He had relocated to Baton Rouge, Louisiana, by the early 1950s and, equipped with a Fender electric guitar, formed the Rhythm Ramblers, with Isaiah Chapman (lead guitar), Jimmy Dotson (drums), and Sylvester Buckley (harmonica). They stayed together for almost ten years and contributed to the development of the Baton Rouge blues sound,

In 1962, when Hogan was 51, Slim Harpo introduced him to J. D. "Jay" Miller, a record producer based in Crowley, Louisiana. Miller, through the offices of Excello Records, started Hogan's recording career, at a time when interest in variations of swamp blues was waning. Several singles by Hogan were nevertheless released until 1965, when Miller's disagreement with the record label's new owners brought the recording contract to an abrupt end. On some of his recordings, Hogan was backed by the harmonica player Moses "Whispering" Smith. Hogan had to disband the group and returned to his full-time job at the Exxon oil refinery. In the late 1970s, he recorded additional tracks for Arhoolie and Blue Horizon.

Hogan died in January 1994 of heart disease, at the age of 82.

Discography

Albums

Compilation albums

See also
List of Louisiana blues musicians
List of swamp blues musicians

References

External links
 Illustrated Silas Hogan discography

1911 births
1994 deaths
American blues guitarists
American male guitarists
Blues musicians from Louisiana
American blues singers
Songwriters from Louisiana
Louisiana blues musicians
Swamp blues musicians
People from West Baton Rouge Parish, Louisiana
Musicians from Baton Rouge, Louisiana
20th-century American singers
20th-century American guitarists
Singers from Louisiana
Guitarists from Louisiana
Excello Records artists
20th-century American male singers
Arhoolie Records artists
American male songwriters